The 2001–02 season was the 74th in the history of Real Valladolid and their ninth consecutive season in the top flight. The club participated in La Liga and Copa del Rey.

Players

Transfers

In

Out

Pre-season and friendlies

Competitions

Overall record

La Liga

League table

Results summary

Results by round

Matches

Copa del Rey

Statistics

Goalscorers

References 

Real Valladolid seasons
Valladolid